John Coffey (14 January 1918 – 11 August 2019) was an Irish hurler. His league and championship career with the Tipperary senior spanned nine seasons from 1940 until 1948. As of 2018, he was one of only four All-Ireland hurling medallists to have become a centenarian.

Coffey made his debut on the inter-county scene at the age of sixteen when he was selected for the Tipperary minor team. He enjoyed three championship seasons with the minor team, the highlight of which was the winning of an All-Ireland medal in his debut year in 1934. Coffey subsequently joined the Tipperary junior team and played without success between 1936 and 1940. By this stage he had also joined the Tipperary senior team, making his debut during the 1940 championship. Coffey was a regular member of the starting fifteen at various times over the following nine seasons and won his sole All-Ireland medal in 1945. He also won one Munster medal. Coffey retired from inter-county hurling following the conclusion of the 1948 championship.

He died in August 2019 at the age of 101.

Honours

Tipperary
All-Ireland Senior Hurling Championship (1): 1945
Munster Senior Hurling Championship (1): 1945
All-Ireland Minor Hurling Championship (1): 1934
Munster Minor Hurling Championship (1): 1934

References

1918 births
2019 deaths
All-Ireland Senior Hurling Championship winners
Boherlahan-Dualla hurlers
Irish centenarians
Men centenarians
Tipperary inter-county hurlers